Calcium/cholecalciferol is a combination of a calcium salt (usually calcium carbonate) and vitamin D3 (cholecalciferol). It is used to prevent and treat lack of calcium and vitamin D in the elderly, as well for osteoporosis in combination with other medications.
18 February 2021

In 2020, the combination, calcium/vitamin D was the 215th most commonly prescribed medication in the United States, with more than 2million prescriptions.

Adverse effects
Possible side effects include gastrointestinal problems, for example nausea and constipation. If very high doses are taken, signs of hypercalcaemia (abnormally high blood calcium levels) have been described, such as stomach pain, vomiting, thirst, and tiredness. Extreme or long-term or overdose can theoretically result in hypervitaminosis D, kidney stones, chronic kidney disease, and calcinosis.

Interactions
Calcium forms complexes with a number of pharmaceutical drugs, reducing their bioavailability; among them are tetracyclines, quinolone antibiotics, levothyroxine, and bisphosphonates, as well as iron, magnesium and zinc supplements. Vitamin D in usual doses has no relevant interactions.

References

Calcium
Vitamin D
Combination drugs